Doug Wooldridge (born 19 December 1985 in Lindsay, Ontario) is a rugby union prop who played for Ontario Blues and  Canada.
Wooldridge  made his debut for Canada in 2009 and was part of the Canada squad at the 2015 Rugby World Cup. Few months after the World Cup, Wooldridge joined ASM Clermont in Top 14 as a medical cover for the Georgian tight head prop, Davit Zirakashvili.

References

External links

1985 births
Living people
ASM Clermont Auvergne players
Canada international rugby union players
Canadian rugby union players
Rugby union props